The Don't Weaponize the IRS Act is a proposed bill in the United States Congress which would reduce the amount of information that nonprofit organizations are required to report to the US Internal Revenue Service. 

The bill would be a codification of a Trump-era rule where organizations would not be required to report the names and addresses of their major donors to the IRS.

Background 
The bill was drawn up partially as a response to proposed changes included in the For the People Act, and partially in response to the 2013 IRS targeting controversy.

Support and opposition 
Proponents of the bill claim the bill will improve privacy of taxpayers, avoiding partisan harassment and retaliation, and say that the data collection is unnecessary for tax collection purposes. In Congress, the legislation is supported by exclusively by members of the Republican Party, with 48 cosponsors in the Senate.

Members of the Democratic Party have been sharply critical of the policy behind the bill. In April 2021, 40 Senate Democrats signed a letter calling for the Trump-era rule to be overturned, pointing to the rule's potential to hamper investigations into foreign election spending, dark money, and illegal activity. In May 2021, 30 House Democrats sent another letter directly critical of the bill, citing similar concerns about the disclosures being necessary for transparency in the wake of Citizens United v. FEC decision.

References

Proposed legislation of the 117th United States Congress
United States proposed federal taxation legislation